Botho Prinz zu Sayn-Wittgenstein-Hohenstein (His Serene Highness Prince Botho of Sayn-Wittgenstein-Hohenstein) (16 February 1927 in Eisenach – 27 January 2008 in Salzburg) was a German politician. He was a member of the Christian Democratic Union and represented the party in the Bundestag from 1965 to 1980. He first gained a direct mandate as representative of Siegen-Wittgenstein and subsequently was elected from the land list.

He served as president of the German Red Cross between 1982 and 1994.

External links and references
Welt Online: Botho Prinz zu Sayn-Wittgenstein-Hohenstein obituary (German) 28 January 2008

Notes

1927 births
2008 deaths
Grand Crosses with Star and Sash of the Order of Merit of the Federal Republic of Germany
Botho Prinz zu Sayn-Wittgenstein-Hohenstein
German Red Cross personnel